= Music & Media =

Pan-European music publication (1984–2003)

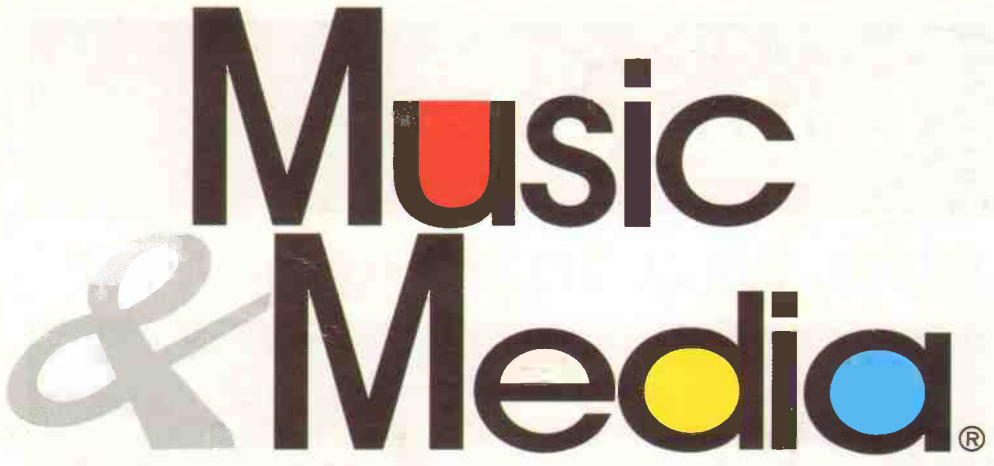
- Categories: Entertainment industry
- Frequency: Weekly
- First issue: 19 March 1984; 42 years ago
- Final issue: 9 August 2003
- Based in: London, England
- ISSN: 1385-612X
- OCLC: 29800226

Music & Media was a pan-European magazine for radio, music and entertainment.

== Description and history ==
The magazine focused specifically on radio, TV, music, charts and related areas of entertainment such as music festivals and events. It was initially published in 1984 as Eurotipsheet, but in 1986 it changed its name to Music & Media. It was originally based in Amsterdam but later moved to London. Music & Media was the sister publication of Billboard magazine. Music & Media ceased publication in August 2003.

== Record charts ==
Main charts

- European Top 100 Albums (sales)
- European Hot 100 Singles (sales)
- European Airplay Top 50 (airplay) (previously called European Hit Radio Top 40)
- European Border Breakers (airplay of European songs breaking out of their country of signing)
- Top 10 Sales in Europe - top 10 singles and albums charts for sixteen European countries: UK, Germany, France, Italy, Spain, Holland, Belgium, Sweden, Denmark, Norway, Finland, Ireland, Switzerland, Austria, Greece, Portugal; later included Hungary

Billboard became Music & Media's financial partner in 1985 and later owned the magazine. When Music & Media closed in August 2003, Billboard continued to compile the European Top 100 Albums and Eurochart Hot 100 Singles.

== Awards ==
The publication presented the Pan European Awards, later called Music & Media Year End Awards. Winners were selected by the European Music Report, recognizing artists with the "greatest sales achievements" in Europe throughout the year, based on the sales and chart performance of artists on the European Hot 100 and European Top 100 Albums, as well as the European Airplay Top 50 beginning in 1990. Some of the first-decade perennial winners were Michael Jackson, Bruce Springsteen and Madonna, with the lattermost receiving the special Eurochart Artist of The Decade in 1994, for her continued success in all of their chart formats. According to a 1985 report, presentations of the trophy to the artists were filmed in some European TV programs.

Music & Media also presented the DJ Awards, where winners were chosen by DJs, producers and programme directors from private and state ratio stations all over Europe.
